Cytochrome P450 family 107 subfamily G member 1 (abbreviated CYP107G1) is an actinobacterial Cytochrome P450 enzyme originally from Streptomyces rapamycinicus, which catalyzes the oxidation reaction of C27 of pre-rapamycin in the biosynthesis pathway of the macrolide antibiotic rapamycin.

References 

Cytochrome P450
EC 1.14.15
Prokaryote genes